Miss Venezuela 1988 was the 35th Miss Venezuela pageant, was held in Caracas, Venezuela on February 5, 1988, after weeks of events.  The winner of the pageant was Yajaira Vera, Miss Miranda.

The pageant was broadcast live on Venevision from the Teatro Municipal in Caracas. At the conclusion of the final night of competition, outgoing titleholder Inés Maria Calero, crowned Yajaira Vera of Miranda as the new Miss Venezuela. Two new titles were added for a total of 5 titles to be contested.

Results
Miss Venezuela 1988 - Yajaira Vera (Miss Miranda)
Miss World Venezuela 1988 - Emma Rabbe (Miss Distrito Federal) 
Miss Venezuela International 1988 - María Eugenia Duarte (Miss Península Goajira) 
Miss Wonderland Venezuela 1988 - Constanza Giner (Miss Aragua)
Miss Venezuela Latina 1988 - Marilisa Maronese (Miss Portuguesa)

The runners-up were:
1st runner-up - Nancy García (Miss Táchira)
2nd runner-up - Joanne Goiri (Miss Lara)
3rd runner-up - Livia Castellanos (Miss Municipio Libertador)

Special awards
 Miss Photogenic (voted by press reporters) - Marilisa Maronese (Miss Portuguesa)
 Miss Congeniality - Livia Castellanos (Miss Municipio Libertador)
 Miss Elegance - Constanza Giner (Miss Aragua)

Delegates

The Miss Venezuela 1988 delegates are:

Miss Amazonas - Graciela Dinora Hubscher Krowitz
Miss Anzoátegui - Marietta Limia Schuller
Miss Apure - Begoña Sánchez-Biezma Fernández
Miss Aragua - Constanza Rosa Giner Barreto
Miss Barinas - Yuli Karina García Espinoza 
Miss Bolívar - Maria José Villaseco Blanco
Miss Carabobo -  Pamela Wildhaber Ramírez
Miss Costa Oriental - Marianellys Pilar Sánchez de Andrade
Miss Delta Amacuro - Elsa Maria Nóbrega Hobbsch
Distrito Federal - Emma Marina Irmgard Rabbe Ramírez
Miss Falcón - Carolina Irene Rode Pelckmann
Miss Guárico - Bertha Rozanny Fuentes Leon
Miss Lara -  Joanne Úrsula Goiri González
Miss Mérida - Yazmín Quintero Dávila
Miss Miranda - Yajaira Cristina Vera Roldán
Miss Monagas - Marisabel Valdés Fairfoot
Miss Municipio Libertador - Livia Elizabeth Castellanos Leiva
Miss Municipio Vargas - Rita Rosina Verreos
Miss Nueva Esparta -  Sara Cristina Salomón Luboschowz
Miss Península Goajira - Maria Eugenia Duarte Lugo
Miss Portuguesa - Mariana Elizabeth (Marilisa) Maronese Rivetta
Miss Sucre - Marlene Klara Herner
Miss Táchira - Nancy Elena García Amor
Miss Trujillo - Francesca Cerro
Miss Yaracuy - Elizabeth Tibisay López Villavicencio
Miss Zulia - Maribel Karissa Colina Marín

Contestants notes
Marilisa Maronese Rivetta (Portuguesa) later became in Chayanne's wife.
Rita Rosina Verreos (Municipio Vargas) competed on Survivor: Fiji  (United States) in 2007.

External links
Miss Venezuela official website

1988 beauty pageants
1988 in Venezuela
February 1988 events in South America